Shannon Currier is an American football coach and former player. He is the head football coach at Concordia University in Saint Paul, Minnesota, a position he held from 2000 to 2003 and resumed in 2016. Currier was the head football coach at Truman State University in Kirksville, Missouri from 2004 to 2008.

Head coaching record

References

External links
 Concordia profile

Year of birth missing (living people)
Living people
American football quarterbacks
Bemidji State Beavers football coaches
Concordia Golden Bears football coaches
Hamline Pipers football players
Minnesota Crookston Golden Eagles football coaches
Southwest Minnesota State Mustangs football coaches
Truman Bulldogs football coaches
High school football coaches in California
Iowa Wesleyan University alumni